Camponotus clarior is a species of ant in the genus Camponotus. Described by Forel in 1902, the species is native to Australia.

See also
List of ants of Australia
List of Camponotus species''

References

clarior
Hymenoptera of Australia
Insects described in 1902